The 1964–65 Women's Handball European Champions Cup was the fifth edition of the international competition for European women's handball national champion clubs, taking place from late 1964 to 16 April 1965. The number of contestants decreased from thirteen to ten due to the absences of Austria, Poland and Romania, so the qualifying stage was reduced from five ties to just two. Unlike the two previous editions, the final was carried out as a two-legged tie.

HG Copenhague became the first team from the Western Bloc to win the competition in the third appearance in a row of the Danish representative in the final, while Budapesti Spartacus was the first Hungarian team to reach it. The absence of Romania meant there was no defending champion this year.

Qualifying stage

Quarter-finals

Semifinals

Final

References

European Cup women
European Cup women
Women's EHF Champions League
Eur
Eur